Ratcliffe-on-Soar Power Station is a coal-fired power station owned and operated by Uniper at Ratcliffe-on-Soar in Nottinghamshire, England. Commissioned in 1968 by the Central Electricity Generating Board, the station has a capacity of 2,000 MW. As of January 2023, it is one of only three coal-fired power stations left in the UK, and is scheduled to close in September 2024.

Description

It has four units, each consisting of a coal-fired boiler made by Babcock & Wilcox driving a 500 megawatt (MW) Parsons generator set. The four boilers are rated at 435 kg/s, steam conditions were 158.58 bar at 566 °C, with reheat to 566 °C. This gives the station a total generating capacity of 2.116 GW, which is enough electricity to meet the needs of approximately 2.02 million homes. There are 4 x 17.5 MW auxiliary gas turbines on the site; these were commissioned in December 1966.

Ratcliffe power station is supplied with coal and other bulk commodities by rail via a branch off the adjacent Midland Main Line (MML). Rail facilities include a north facing junction off the MML slow lines, two tracks of weighbridges, coal discharge hoppers, and a flue gas desulfurisation discharge and loading hopper. There was formerly a fly ash bunker and loading point with a south-facing connection to the MML, this was extant in 1990 but had been demolished and disconnected by 2005.

Uniper has its Technology Centre at the site, where it carries out research and development on power generation.

Environmental performance
The plant emits 8–10 million tonnes of  annually making it the 18th highest -emitting power station in Europe as of 2009.

Ratcliffe power station is compliant with the Large Combustion Plant Directive (LCPD), an EU directive that aims to reduce acidification, ground level ozone and particulates by controlling the emissions of sulphur dioxide, oxides of nitrogen and dust from large combustion plants. To reduce emissions of sulphur the plant is fitted with Flue Gas Desulphurisation, and also with a Boosted Over Fire Air system to reduce the concentration of oxides of nitrogen in the flue gas.

Ratcliffe power station is the first in the United Kingdom to be fitted with Selective Catalytic Reduction (SCR) technology, which reduces the emissions of nitrogen oxides, through the injection of ammonia directly into the flue gas and passing it over a catalyst.

History
The construction of the power station began in 1963 and it opened in 1968.

The architects were Godfrey Rossant and J. W. Gebarowicz of Building Design Partnership. White cladding was used on the boiler and turbine houses and the end elevations had vertical bands of glazing to emphasise their verticality, the four concrete coal bunkers projected above the roof-line.

In 1981, the station was burning 5.5 million tonnes of coal a year, consuming 65% of the output of south Nottinghamshire's coal-mines. Emissions of sulphur dioxide, which cause acid rain, were greatly reduced in 1993 when a flue gas desulphurisation system using a wet limestone-gypsum process became operational on all of the station's boilers. Emissions of oxides of nitrogen, greenhouse gases which also cause damage to the ozone layer, were reduced in 2004 when new equipment was fitted to Unit 1 by Alstom.

In 1975/76 and again in 1986/87 Ratcliffe was presented with the Hinton Cup, the CEGB's "good house keeping trophy". The award was commissioned by Sir Christopher Hinton, the first chairman of the CEGB.

On 11 February 2009, Unit 1 became the first UK 500 MW coal-fired unit to run for 250,000 hours.

On 2 April 2009, E.ON UK announced it had installed a 68 panel solar photovoltaic array at the power station "to help heat and light the admin block, saving an estimated 6.3 tonnes of carbon dioxide per year".

In June 2021, the site was listed as a possible location for the world's first nuclear fusion power plant. However, it was withdrawn from the shortlist in January 2022.

In response to the 2021 United Kingdom natural gas supplier crisis, the decommissioning of one of the station's 500 megawatt units in September 2022 has been delayed to prevent UK blackouts.

Environmental protests

On 10 April 2007, eleven environmental activists from a group called Eastside Climate Action were arrested after they entered the power station and climbed onto equipment in order to draw attention to greenhouse gas emissions from coal-fired power stations, when E.ON UK was proposing to build more.

In 2009, the station was the intended target of protestors when, in the early hours of 14 April, police arrested 114 people at Iona School who were planning to disrupt the running of the power plant.  Those arrested were not charged and soon released on bail. Later, 26 of those arrested were charged with conspiracy to commit aggravated trespass, a charge that carries a maximum six months sentence. Twenty of these activists, having admitted that they planned to break into the power station, were found guilty of conspiracy to commit aggravated trespass. When sentencing 18 of these protesters, in December 2010, the judge called them '...decent men and women...' and handed out community orders with only two having to pay reduced expenses. The charge against the six pleading not guilty was dropped when it was revealed that Mark Kennedy of the Metropolitan Police had been working as an undercover infiltrator for the National Public Order Intelligence Unit and had played a significant role in organising the action. Additionally, recordings made by Kennedy should have been made available to the Crown Prosecution Service and the defence team, in accordance with the Criminal Procedure and Investigations Act 1996. Following these revelations the 20 convicted activists appealed, and their convictions have since been quashed.

Between 17 and 18 October 2009, protesters from Climate Camp, Climate Rush and Plane Stupid, took part in The Great Climate Swoop at the site. The police arrested 10 people before the protest began on suspicion of conspiracy to cause criminal damage. Some 1,000 people took part, and during the first day groups of up to several hundred people pulled down security fencing at a number of points around the plant. Fifty-six arrests were made during the protest and a number of people were injured, including a policeman, who was airlifted to hospital but later discharged.

References

External links

 Uniper UK
 BBC Nottingham gallery.
 Ratcliffe on Soar Power Station photos on Flickr

Buildings and structures in Nottinghamshire
Coal-fired power stations in England
Power stations in the East Midlands
1968 establishments in England
Energy infrastructure completed in 1968
Uniper